The dorsum sellae is part of the sphenoid bone in the skull. Together with the basilar part of the occipital bone it forms the clivus.

In the sphenoid bone, the anterior boundary of the sella turcica is completed by two small eminences, one on either side, called the middle clinoid processes, while the posterior boundary is formed by a square-shaped plate of bone, the dorsum sellae, ending at its superior angles in two tubercles, the posterior clinoid processes, the size and form of which vary considerably in different individuals.

Additional images

References

External links
 
 

Bones of the head and neck